Anakim ( ʿĂnāqīm) are mentioned in the Bible as a race of giants, descended from Anak.

According to the Old Testament, the Anakim lived in the southern part of the land of Canaan, near Hebron (Gen. 23:2; Josh. 15:13).  states that they inhabited the region later known as Edom and Moab in the days of Abraham. The name may come from a Hebrew root meaning "necklace" or "neck-chain".

Their formidable appearance, as described by the Twelve Spies sent to search the land, filled the Israelites with terror. The Israelites seem to have identified them with the Nephilim, the giants of the antediluvian age. Joshua finally expelled them from the land, except for some who found a refuge in the Philistine cities of Gaza, Gath, and Ashdod, thus the Philistine giants (Goliath) whom David encountered (2 Samuel 21:15-22) were descendants of the Anakim.

The Septuagint translation of Jeremiah 47:5 refers to the descendants of the Anakim mourning after the destruction of Gaza.

The Egyptian Execration texts of the Middle Kingdom (2055-1650 BC) mention a list of political enemies in Canaan, and among this list are a group called the "ly Anaq" or people of Anaq. The three rulers of ly Anaq were Erum, Abiyamimu, and Akirum.

See also
 Nephilim

References

 
Book of Genesis
Edom
Moab
Giants in the Hebrew Bible
Hebrew Bible nations
Rephaites